Verbling is an online language learning platform that pairs individuals with language teachers via video chat. The company was created at Y Combinator in 2011. In 2015, Verbling raised $2.7 million in series A round funding. Funders have included Draper Fisher Jurvetson, SV Angel, Sam Altman, and Joshua Schachter.

History
Verbling was founded in 2011 by Jake Jolis, Mikael Bernstein, and Gustav Rydstedt after meeting while attending Stanford University. The company's initial platform, Verbling Friends, connected users interested in learning each other's language to each other via video chat. Verbling was backed by Y Combinator and listed as one of five startups to watch in Summer 2011 by Gigaom. 

Verbling Enterprise aims to address one of the biggest problems in international business: language barriers. Although email, chat, and video conferencing have made it easy to communicate over long distances, international colleagues don't necessarily understand each other.

In 2012, the company raised $1 million in funding and moved its headquarters from Palo Alto to San Francisco, California. In November 2013, the company added nine new languages and Google Hangouts-powered chats. Verbling also launched Verbling Classes, a teaching platform in December 2013, which were later discontinued in favor of private lessons. The classes were also live streamed so other users could watch the class without directly interacting with the lesson.

In 2015, Verbling raised $2.7 million in series A round funding to expand its technology to more platforms. The same year the company began offering free lessons in Swedish to Syrian refugees displaced by the Syrian Civil War.

In October 2016, the company launched Verbling Enterprise, a platform designed for companies to help their employees take language lessons online, with Volkswagen Group and Inditex as partners.

In 2017, Verbling launched Android and iOS mobile apps. The platform had 2000 teachers, offering classes in 43 languages, that year.

References

E-learning
Language education
Online marketplaces of the United States